Niilo Juvonen (29 December 1928 – 24 January 1986) was a Finnish alpine skier who competed in the 1952 Winter Olympics.

References

1928 births
1986 deaths
Finnish male alpine skiers
Olympic alpine skiers of Finland
Alpine skiers at the 1952 Winter Olympics